Jesús Vicente Zambada Niebla (born 24 March 1975), also known as "El Vicentillo", is a Mexican convicted drug lord and former high-ranking member of the Sinaloa Cartel, a criminal group based in Sinaloa. He is the son of Ismael "El Mayo" Zambada, one of world's most-wanted and powerful drug lords. He was arrested in Mexico City on 19 March 2009 and extradited to the United States in February 2010 to stand trial on narco-trafficking-related charges. He was sentenced to 15 years in prison on 30 May 2019. Due to his cooperation in testifying against several members of the Sinaloa Cartel, his conviction term was reduced.

Charges and plea deal
Zambada was charged with trafficking more than a billion dollars' worth of cocaine and heroin. In a 2013 plea bargain deal which was made public by a U.S. District Court in 2014, Zambada admitted coordinating smuggling tons of cocaine and heroin with "El Chapo", Joaquín Guzmán Loera, and agreed to forfeit assets of $1.37 billion to the US government. The plea bargain resulted in a fine of $4 million and 15 years in prison. He is considered a top potential witness against "El Chapo."

On 8 November 2018, a plea agreement was filed in the United States District Court for the District of Illinois in which Zambada pleaded guilty to working with El Chapo and others to illegally import into the United States thousands of kilos of cocaine. Zambada and others used private planes, submarines, and speedboats to smuggle the drugs from Colombia to Mexico, and then into the United States. In return for Zambada's cooperation the government recommended more lenient sentencing guidelines and that measures be taken to ensure his family's safety. These included having Zambada and his family be allowed to remain permanently in the United States.

Relationships
Jesús Vicente Zambada Niebla is the son of Ismael Zambada García (alias, "El Mayo"), the top leader of the Sinaloa drug-trafficking organization.
Vicente Zambada Niebla is the subject of the book El Traidor by Anabel Hernández.

See also
 List of Mexico's 37 most-wanted drug lords (2009)
 Mérida Initiative
 Mexican Drug War

References

External links
 Photograph of Vicente Zambada Niebla Miriam Reyes 

1975 births
Fugitives
Fugitives wanted on organised crime charges
Living people
Mexican drug traffickers
Mexican people imprisoned abroad
People convicted of drug offenses
People extradited from Mexico to the United States
People from Culiacán
Prisoners and detainees of the United States federal government
Sinaloa Cartel traffickers